Théo Collomb (born 11 July 2000) is a French footballer who plays as a forward for the HFX Wanderers of the Canadian Premier League.

Early life
Collomb began his youth career with Cournon-d'Auvergne. In 2015, he joined the youth system of Clermont.

College career
In 2020, he began attending the University of North Carolina at Greensboro, where he played for the men's soccer team. On 17 February 2021, he scored his first career collegiate goal and registered his first assist during a 4-1 victory over the Belmont Abbey Crusaders. In his freshman season in the 2021 spring season (which was delayed from the regular 2020 fall season due to the COVID-19 pandemic), he won the Southern Conference Tournament with the team. He was named to the South All-Region Third Team, was the SoCon co-Freshman of the Year, and was an All SoCon First Team selection and SoCon All-Freshman Team selection.

On 25 September 2021, he scored his first hat trick and also added two assists in a 7-1 victory over the VMI Keydets, which earned him all three major National Player of the Week Awards in the country. At the end of his sophomore season, he was named the SoCon Player of the Year. He was also named to the United Soccer Coaches All-America Second Team, as well as the College Soccer News All-America Second Team and the TopDrawerSoccer Best XI Third Team. After the season, he was invited to participate in the Major League Soccer College Showcase.

Club career
In 2018, he began playing for Clermont II in the Championnat National 3. On 2 September 2018, he scored a hat trick in a 6-1 victory over Ytrac. He played three seasons with the Clermont second team, making 30 appearances, including 15 starts, scoring nine goals.

In January 2022, Collomb was selected 72nd overall in the 2022 MLS SuperDraft by Vancouver Whitecaps FC. In March 2022, he signed a professional contract with the Whitecaps second team, Whitecaps FC 2, in MLS Next Pro. On 17 June 2022, he scored a brace against North Texas SC in a 3-1 victory.

In February 2023, he joined Canadian Premier League club HFX Wanderers FC on a one-year contract, with a club option for 2023.

International career
In 2019, he played for France at the 2019 FISU Universiade Games. In an exhibition match prior to the tournament, he scored the only goal in a 1-0 victory over the Ireland Universiade side.

Career statistics

References

External links

2000 births
Living people
Association football forwards
Championnat National 3 players
Clermont Foot players
Expatriate soccer players in the United States
French footballers
French expatriate footballers
French expatriate sportspeople in the United States
MLS Next Pro players
UNC Greensboro Spartans men's soccer players
Vancouver Whitecaps FC draft picks
Whitecaps FC 2 players
HFX Wanderers FC players
Canadian Premier League players
Competitors at the 2019 Summer Universiade